Sir Edward Victor Luckhoo OR (24 May 1912 – 3 March 1998) was a Guyanese politician that was the last Governor-General of Guyana, and briefly the acting head of state of the Co‑operative Republic of Guyana on its formation in 1970.

Family and education
He was born in New Amsterdam, Berbice, the son of British Raj immigrants Evelyn Maude Mungal-Singh and Edward Luckhoo Alfred, a solicitor of Indian extraction, and educated at Queen's College, Guyana and St Catherine's College, Oxford, where he was awarded a Bachelor of Arts degree. He studied law at the Middle Temple, where he was called to the bar in 1931. Admitted to practice in 1936, he was made Queen's Counsel in 1965. His grandfather Moses Luckhoo came from India as labourer on sugar plantations.

He was the brother of lawyer and diplomat Sir Lionel Luckhoo, who was the British High Commissioner for Guyana and Barbados.

Career
He was appointed a Justice of Appeal in 1966 and Chancellor of the Judiciary in October 1969.

As Chancellor of the Judiciary from 1969 to 1976, he briefly served as the acting head of state of the Co‑operative Republic of Guyana  became a Republic on 23 February 1970. Therefore, Luckhoo was never the president of Guyana and was not officially mentioned.

Honours
He was knighted on 1 January 1970 and received the Order of Roraima of Guyana in 1976.

   Knight Bachelor
  Order of Roraima of Guyana

Private life
Edward Luckhoo was married to Maureen Moxlow of Batley, West Yorkshire, on 9 November 1981. In retirement, they returned to West Yorkshire, and lived in Ossett, where they were both active members of the Anglican Church, and catechists for Confirmation classes. Sir Edward died on 3 March 1998, aged 85, and is buried in Ossett. Lady Luckhoo still resides in the town.

References

1912 births
1998 deaths
Alumni of St Catherine's College, Oxford
Guyanese Anglicans
Guyanese emigrants to England
20th-century Guyanese judges
Guyanese knights
Guyanese politicians of Indian descent
Members of the Middle Temple
20th-century King's Counsel
Knights Bachelor
Governors-General of Guyana
People from New Amsterdam, Guyana